Piccola strenna is an EP by the Italian singer Mina, published on 30 November 2010 by label record PDU record company. The album contains four songs recorded for the soundtrack of the film La banda dei Babbi Natale by Aldo, Giovanni & Giacomo.

Piccola Strenna opens with the track Mele Kalikimaka, a song Christmas joyful and cheerful, sung partly in English and partly in the Hawaiian language. Walking the Town is rather a song-style English rock that adheres perfectly to the setting of a particular scene in the movie, as well as Il sogno di Giacomo whose notes underline the recurring nightmare of one of the protagonists, referring to the atmosphere of classic soundtracks, with the voice of Mina that accompanies the music with vocals thrill. Finally, the best-known Christmas songs, Silent Night is proposed in an exciting and evocative key jazz ballad.

Track listing

References

Mina (Italian singer) soundtracks
2010 soundtrack albums